The sailing competitions at the 2018 Mediterranean Games took place between 23 and 29 June in front of the Salou Yacht Club. Athletes competed in four events.

Medal summary

Men's events

Women's events

Medal table

References

External links
2018 Mediterranean Games – Sailing

Sports at the 2018 Mediterranean Games
2018
Mediterranean Games
Sailing competitions in Spain